Who Wants to Kill Jessie? is a 1966 Czechoslovak science fiction comedy film directed by Václav Vorlíček. The story focuses on a couple who use a machine which can bring objects and people from dreams to the real world. The main plot includes the accidental release of the comics character Jessie into the real world, and the film features many gags about the clash between the real world, and comics imagery such as word balloons and sound effects.

The comics illustrator Kája Saudek participated as the creator of special effects and illustrations for the film.

Cast
 Dana Medřická as doc. Růženka Beránková
 Jiří Sovák as doc. Jindřich Beránek
 Olga Schoberová as Jessie
 Juraj Višný as Superman
 Karel Effa as Gunslingere
 Jan Libíček as Prison Guard
 Valtr Taub as Professor
 Bedřich Prokoš as University Rector
 Ilja Racek as Beránková's colleague
 Otto Šimánek as Beránková's deputy

Release
The film premiered on 26 August 1966.

Notes

References

External links
 

1966 films
1960s Czech-language films
Czechoslovak science fiction comedy films
1960s science fiction comedy films
Films directed by Václav Vorlíček
Czech science fiction comedy films
Czech superhero films
Superhero comedy films
1966 comedy films
1960s Czech films